The Practical Shooting Association of Costa Rica, Spanish La Asociación de Tiro Práctico de Costa Rica, is the Costa Rican association for practical shooting under the International Practical Shooting Confederation.

References 

Regions of the International Practical Shooting Confederation
Practical Shooting